The Central Atlantic hurricane of 1782 was a hurricane that hit the fleet of British Admiral Thomas Graves as it sailed across the North Atlantic in September, 1782. It is believed to have killed some 3,500 people.

Impact
On 17 September 1782, the fleet under Admiral Graves was caught in a violent storm off the banks of Newfoundland. Ardent and Caton were forced to leave the fleet and make for a safe anchorage, Ardent returning to Jamaica and Caton making for Halifax in company with Pallas. Of the rest of the warships, only Canada and Jason survived to reach England. The French prizes Ville de Paris, Glorieux and Hector foundered, as did HMS Centaur.  had to be abandoned, and was burnt. A number of the merchant fleet, including Dutton, British Queen, Withywood, Rodney, Ann, Minerva, and Mentor also foundered.  foundered with the loss of 31 of her 34 crew members. Altogether around 3,500 people died from the various ships.

See also

List of deadliest Atlantic hurricanes

Sources 
The Percy Anecdotes: Shipwreck, by Reuben Percy and Sholto Percy
Papers Past DESTRUCTION OF ADMIRAL GRAVES' FLEET.
Darkest Hours, by Jay Robert Nash 
The history of England: from the accession of George III, 1760-1835, Volume 3, by Thomas Smart Hughes, Tobias George Smollett

Central Atlantic hurricane
Atlantic hurricanes
Unknown-strength tropical cyclones
Central Atlantic hurricane
Central Atlantic hurricane